Ross Moody Russell (March 18, 1909 – January 31, 2000) was an American jazz producer and writer. He was the founder of Dial Records.

Russell wrote pulp fiction in the 1930s. His heroes were Dashiell Hammett and, especially, Raymond Chandler, on whom he wrote an unfinished study. He also worked as a reporter, at one point writing on Luis Russell while on tour. He was in the United States Merchant Marine during World War II. He served in the North Atlantic and was shipwrecked on Novaya Zemlya far above the Arctic Circle. His accounts of this episode appeared in Life magazine and two other periodicals. Later, he had long duty in the South Pacific. After the War, he founded his own record store, the Tempo Music Shop, in Hollywood. In 1946, he formed Dial Records in order to record Charlie Parker, who was in Los Angeles at the time. He also recorded Dizzy Gillespie, Erroll Garner, Howard McGhee, Dodo Marmarosa, Dexter Gordon, Wardell Gray and Earl Coleman. Russell retained all the alternate takes recorded, which sometimes made releases of his material particularly extensive. Dial also was the first record company in the US to record the music of Arnold Schoenberg and other modern masters, such as Béla Bartók and John Cage. He shut Dial down in 1949 and spent several years away from jazz music as owner of a golf course and other pursuits.

Russell's jazz novel The Sound, a book inspired by Parker's life, came out in 1961. In 1971, he published a nonfiction book, Jazz Style in Kansas City and the Southwest, and two years later his biography Bird Lives! was published. Bird Lives! was criticized for its factual inaccuracies; some of the details Russell relates were shown to be fictional. Russell also wrote articles for jazz magazines and taught at the University of California and Palomar College. His large collection of records, books, periodicals, manuscripts, correspondence, interviews, and other materials was sold to the Ransom Center at the University of Texas at Austin in 1981. After retirement he lived variously in the California desert, South Africa, Spain, and Niland, California, on the Salton Sea. He was writing another book on bebop at the time of his death in 2000. He was married five times and had four children. He was buried at the Riverside National Cemetery in Riverside, California.

References

Further reading
Lawn, Richard. 1984. "From Bird to Schoenberg: The Ross Russell Collection". The Library Chronic!e of the University of Texas at Austin, New Series nos. 25–26: pp. 137–47.
Smyth, David. 1989. "Schoenberg and Dial Records: The Composer's Correspondence with Ross Russell". Journal of the Arnold Schoenberg Institute 12, no. 1 (June): 68–90.

External Links
Ross Russell Papers at the Harry Ransom Center

1909 births
2000 deaths
Record producers from California
American music critics
Writers from Los Angeles
Writers from Palm Springs, California
Burials at Riverside National Cemetery
20th-century American businesspeople
Journalists from California
20th-century American journalists
American male journalists